St. Johns is a provincial electoral division in the Canadian province of Manitoba. It was created by redistribution in 1957, and has formally existed since 1958.  It is located in the north-end of Winnipeg. The constituency is bordered by Kildonan to the north and west, Burrows to the west, Elmwood to the east, and Point Douglas to the south.

The riding's population in 1996 was 20,023.  The average family income in 1999 was $40,443, with an unemployment rate of 10.90%.  Over 35% of the riding's residents are categorized as low-income.

St. Johns has a diverse population.  Ten per cent of the riding's residents listed Ukrainian as their ethnic origin in 1999, with a further 6% Polish and 5% Jewish.  Twelve per cent of the riding's residents are aboriginal.  Manufacturing jobs accounted for 18% of the riding's industry, with a further 15% in services.

Since its creation, St. Johns has been represented by members of the Manitoba Co-operative Commonwealth Federation (CCF) and its successor, the New Democratic Party (NDP).  It is considered safe for the party.  The current MLA is Nahanni Fontaine, who was elected in the Manitoba general election, 2016.

Members of the Legislative Assembly
This riding has elected the following MLAs:

Electoral history

References

Manitoba provincial electoral districts
Politics of Winnipeg